The Fairbanks springsnail, scientific name Pyrgulopsis fairbanksensis, is a species of minute freshwater snails with an operculum, aquatic gastropod molluscs or micromolluscs in the family Hydrobiidae.

This species' natural habitat is springs.  It is endemic to Fairbanks Spring, Ash Meadows, Nevada, United States.

Description
Its differentiated from other Pyrgulopsis in that its penial filament has a short lobe and elongate filament with the penial ornament consisting of small, circular terminal gland.

References

Molluscs of the United States
Pyrgulopsis
Gastropods described in 1987
Taxonomy articles created by Polbot